Jenny Lake is located in Grand Teton National Park in the U.S. state of Wyoming. The lake was formed approximately 12,000 years ago by glaciers pushing rock debris which carved Cascade Canyon during the last glacial maximum, forming a terminal moraine which now impounds the lake. Jenny Lake is considered to be a major focal point in Grand Teton National Park, with many hiking trails, scenic boat rides, and quick access to the major climbing routes onto the tallest peaks of the Teton Range.

Jenny and Jackson Lakes are the only lakes in Grand Teton National Park where motorboats are permitted; both lakes have scenic tours available. A 2005 study of the water quality of the lakes in Grand Teton National Park indicated that all the lakes in the park were still considered pristine and that they had not been impacted by air or water pollution.

Jenny Lake is a starting point for many day and overnight hiking trips. However, the altitude increases rapidly once Cascade Canyon is entered.

Jenny Lake is named after a Shoshone Indian woman who married an Englishman, Richard "Beaver Dick" Leigh. Jenny, and their 6 children, died of Smallpox in 1876.

See also
Jenny Lake Ranger Station Historic District

References

Lakes of Grand Teton National Park